Abanazar is a magician and the primary antagonist in the Aladdin pantomime. He was also the basis for Jafar in the Disney version of Aladdin.

History
The character first appeared in the harlequinade Aladin in 1788 as 'The African Magician', but was given the name Abanazer in 1813 in Aladdin or The Wonderful Lamp at Covent Garden Opera House in 1813, described as 'A New Melo-Dramatick Romance', and revived in 1826.  Other names which have been used for the character are Mourad, Abel el Nesir, Kiradamac, Abanazac and Hocus Pocus.  It was with Henry James Byron's Aladdin or the Wonderful Scamp in 1861 that the modern pantomime took form and the character was essentially established. Byron added burlesque (as can be seen by the name parodying the earlier opera) so the character is evil but played for laughs.

Some notable people who have played Abanazer
Paul Bedford 1844 Royal Strand Theatre
Robert Keeley 1844 Lyceum (his wife Mary Anne Keeley was Aladdin)
William Payne 1865 Covent Garden Opera House
Herbert Campbell 1885 Theatre Royal, Drury Lane
Arthur Williams 1885 Prince of Wales's Theatre, Birmingham
Albert Chevalier 1888 Royal Strand Theatre
Harry Tate 1904 Marlborough Theatre, North London
George Graves 1909 Theatre Royal, Drury Lane (picture)
Gillie Potter 1920 various venues
Stanley Holloway 1936 Golders Green Hippodrome
Edwin Styles 1937 Adelphi Theatre
Valentine Dyall 1956 London Palladium
Alfred Marks 1978 London Palladium
Ross Petty 1989 - Televised musical directed by Tony Gilbert.
Martin Clunes 2000 - Television pantomime by Simon Nye.
Simon Callow 2005 Richmond Theatre
Brian Blessed 2009 New Wimbledon Theatre
 Michael Ayiotis 2019 South Hill Park

References

External links
Imdb

Aladdin

Pantomime

Fictional characters who use magic

Musical theatre characters